Vance Warner (born 3 September 1974) is an English former professional footballer who played as a defender from 1994 until 2000 notably for Nottingham Forest, as well as appearing for Grimsby Town and Rotherham United.

Career

Nottingham Forest
Warner came through the youth ranks at Nottingham Forest under Frank Clark during the 1993-1994 Premier League season playing once for England Youth U18's vs France, rooming with David Beckham. Despite being touted as "the new Des Walker", Warner struggled to break into the first team and spent time on loan with Grimsby Town during the 1995–1996 season who were managed by Warner's former teammate Brian Laws. He played 3 times for Grimsby before returning to the City Ground in April 1996.

Rotherham United
Following a two-month loan spell with Rotherham United at the start of the 1997–1998 season, Ronnie Moore convinced Warner to sign for the club on a free transfer in November 1997. Warner played 63 times in league and cup competitions during his time with United, scoring 1 goal on 8 August 1998 in a 3–1 home win over Hull City. He had a memorable chant of 'Ooh Vancey Warner' & was noted for his quick pace & uncompromising tackling style. Warner was released by United in the summer of 2000 after spending three seasons with The Millers.

Personal life
Warner although not officially retiring didn't return to football following his release from Rotherham and since then he has worked for BT.

An active charity fundraiser, Warner ran 3,244 miles over 2 years (2018–2020) to raise money for Teenage Cancer Trust and in memory of the Nottingham Forest youth team coach, John Perkins, who died in 2016.

He completed the '1 Million Steps in March for Clare' challenge in March 2022, walking 1,014,692 steps over 550 miles in 31 days, to raise money for Nottingham University Hospitals Charity and in memory of a friend, Clare Doran, who died in 2021.

References

External links
 
 Since 1888... The Searchable Premiership and Football League Player Database (subscription required)

1974 births
Living people
English footballers
Association football defenders
Premier League players
Nottingham Forest F.C. players
Grimsby Town F.C. players
Rotherham United F.C. players
People educated at West Bridgford School
British Telecom people